Gates County Senior High School (often just called Gates County High School) is a public, co-educational secondary school located in Gatesville, North Carolina. It is the only high school in the Gates County Schools system.

School information
For the 2010–2011 school year, Gates County Senior High School had a total population of 590 students and 47.00 teachers on a (FTE) basis. The student population had a gender ratio of 51.86% male to 48.14% female. The demographic group makeup of the student population was: White, 57.46%; Hispanic, 1.02%; Black, 39.15%; Asian/Pacific Islander, 0.34%; and American Indian, 0.17% (two or more races, 1.86%). For the same school year, 43.22% of the students received free or reduced-cost lunches.

History
The school was opened in 1962, after the consolidation of the former Gatesville High School and Sunbury High School.

Academics
High School was ranked as a Bronze Level school by the U.S. News & World Report.

Athletics
According to the North Carolina High School Athletic Association, for the 2018–2019 school year, Gates County Senior High is a 1A school in the Albemarle Athletic Conference (AAC) . The Gates County mascot is the Red Barons, wearing the school colors of red and white.

Notable alumni
 Jessie Britt, NFL wide receiver
 Thomas Smith, NFL cornerback

References

External links
 

Buildings and structures in Gates County, North Carolina
Education in Gates County, North Carolina
Public high schools in North Carolina